The Bald Mountain Range is a mountain range in Sierra County, California, and is one of the locations where the Washoe Pine is found.

References 

Mountain ranges of Northern California
Mountain ranges of Sierra County, California